Kevin John Wickham (21 July 1939 – 4 July 2020) was an Australian rower. He competed as coxswain in the men's eight event at the 1964 Summer Olympics.

Wickham was raised in Colac, Victoria. He began his career as a cox with the Banks Rowing Club in Melbourne, and progressed to the World Rowing Championships in 1962, where he coxed a four that finished in fifth place. He also competed in the 1964 King's Cup.

References

External links
 

1939 births
2020 deaths
Australian male rowers
Olympic rowers of Australia
Rowers at the 1964 Summer Olympics
Place of birth missing
20th-century Australian people